"Ti amo" is a 1977 song by Umberto Tozzi, later covered by multiple artists.

Ti amo may also refer to:

 Ti Amo (album), a 2017 album by Phoenix
 Ti amo..., a 2006 album by Mina
 "Ti Amo" (Gina G song), a 1997 song by Gina G

See also 
 Te Amo (disambiguation)
 I Love You (disambiguation)